KCHE (1440 AM) is a commercial radio station licensed to serve the community of Cherokee, Iowa.  The station primarily broadcasts an adult standards format.  KCHE is owned by Simon Fuller, through licensee Better Broadcasting Incorporated. It was first licensed on March 10, 1953.

Former owners include Sioux Valley Broadcasting Company, Inc, Cherokee Broadcasting Company, and J & J Broadcasting Corporation.

External links
KCHE official website

FCC History Cards for KCHE

CHE
Cherokee, Iowa
Radio stations established in 1953
1953 establishments in Iowa